The 1996 RTHK Top 10 Gold Songs Awards was held in 1996 for the 1995 music season.

Top 10 song awards
The top 10 songs (十大中文金曲) of 1996 are as follows.

Other awards

References
 RTHK top 10 gold song awards 1996

RTHK Top 10 Gold Songs Awards
Rthk Top 10 Gold Songs Awards, 1996
Rthk Top 10 Gold Songs Awards, 1996